Charles Finch, 4th Earl of Winchilsea PC (26 September 1672 – 16 August 1712) was a British peer and Member of Parliament, styled Viscount Maidstone until 1689.  He was the son of William Finch, Lord Maidstone (son of Heneage Finch, 3rd Earl of Winchilsea) and Elizabeth Wyndham.

From 1702 to 1703 he served as Ambassador Extraordinary to Hanover. In 1702, he was appointed Vice-Admiral of Kent, and in 1704, Lord Lieutenant and Custos Rotulorum of that county. He was dismissed from all his Kentish offices in 1705. In 1711, he was sworn of the Privy Council and was appointed First Lord of Trade. Upon his death in 1712, he was succeeded as Earl of Winchilsea by his uncle, Heneage Finch.

References

1672 births
1712 deaths
17th-century English nobility
18th-century English nobility
18th-century diplomats
18th-century Royal Navy personnel
Diplomatic peers
04
02
Lord-Lieutenants of Kent
Members of the Privy Council of Great Britain
Charles
Presidents of the Board of Trade